Maolán was an early Christian bishop in Connacht, whose feast day is given as 25 December. He is commemorated in the placnames Cill Easpaig Mhaoláin (the church of Bishop Maolán) or Killaspugmoylan, parish of Kilconickny, Loughrea) and Cill Mhaoláin (the church of  Maolán) or Kilmoylan, a parish four miles south of Tuam.

See also

Conainne
Ciarán of Clonmacnoise
Brendan
Kerrill
Soghain

References

 Early Ecclesiastical Settlement Names of County Galway, Dónall Mac Giolla Easpaig, in Galway:History and Society, 1996, pp. 802–03.

People from County Galway
5th-century Irish bishops
Medieval saints of Connacht